Epper is a surname. Notable people with the surname include:

Gary Epper (1944–2007), American stunt performer
Jeannie Epper (born 1941), American stunt performer and actress
Tony Epper (1938–2012), American actor and stunt performer

See also
Epner (surname)
Esper (name)